Goh Soon Tioe is known in Singapore musical history as a key player in the development of classical music for the post-war Singapore. He is also the father of Singaporean violinist-conductor Vivien Goh.

Born on 18 October 1911 in Padang, Indonesia, Goh was the tenth of the eleven children in the family. His father Gho Goan Tee owned a trading firm and was a local Kapitan – a spokesperson for the Padang Chinese community and a representative for the Chinese government. Mother Lie Kie Pat was from Nias and was of mixed Chinese and native parentage. They live in house on Batipoeh-Straat (now known as Jalan Pasar Batipuh), Kampoeng-Tjina in Padang.

The elder Gho died when Goh was three years old, leaving him in the care of his mother and Goh's older siblings. As a boy, Goh studied in the local town school and primarily taught in Dutch language. But he was active and mischievous child who often played truant from school and indulge in cock fighting. His strict disciplinarian mum would often punish him for playing truant – at one time she even put a ball and chain on the boy's leg, and sent him to school in a horse carriage, or a Bendi.

It came to the point that his mother felt she could not control him any longer, and thus sent him and other relatives to Singapore. Goh was 13 years old then, living with his 2nd eldest brother Soon Ho in Newton Road and continued his schooling at the Anglo-Chinese School. The year was 1924.

Goh's family members were musically-inclined. In his home in Padang, there was a piano left behind from his grandfather's time. And not to mention that Goh Soon Hin, his third elder brother also played the violin. But in all his childhood years the young Goh had never expressed any interest in music at all. And thus his passion for music started relatively late – and by chance as well.

It was the time when he moved to Singapore, he would hear his cook's son playing the violin at the back of their Newton house every night. That got the 17-year-old Goh interested in the violin, and embarked his musical journey with the violin with his first teacher, Filipino violinist Aguedo Raquiza. Raquiza taught all that he knew to his prodigy, and advised him to seek further instruction overseas. Despite his newfound love and conviction to become a great violinist, he could not convince his family to let him study music overseas. Instead, he was sent to work in their family business. But music still was never far from his mind.

Europe and Spain
In 1932, he received an opportunity to audition for a recruitment by the Geneva Conservatoire in Switzerland. The panellists did not take to his performance kindly, and thought he was not good enough to be selected. With anger and disappointment, he resolved to impress the panel with his performance in the next audition. He began taking lessons from Maggie Breittmayer who drove him hard and polished his technique. He pushed himself harder practising 8–10 hours a day for the next 6 months. And finally, his talent stunned the audition panel and admitted him directly to the Superiere level of study. A Swiss pianist serving as one of the Conservatoire panellists even helped the convince Goh's family members to allow him to study music and develop his talent at the Conservatoire. In the three years of music study with the Conservatoire, he was trained by Breittmayer and Oscar Studer, even took classes in solfege, harmony and chamber music as well. Goh performed excellently in all his annual exams, receiving the Premier Prix distinction award consecutively for three years. Goh even played with the Conservatoire Orchestra under Samuel Baud-Bovy. He had also made new friends during his years in Switzerland – with father-son violin makers Alfred and Pierre Vidoudez, and American-Italian violinist Joseph Nardulli. Pierre helped him to correct his violin technique, and taught him the French language.

In all this time Goh's studies were funded by his family, but in 1935 he received news that his family could no longer support him in his music study, urging him to return to Sumatra to teach music instead. By August that year, Goh's finances dried up. Just as things was looking bad for him, Alfred Vidoudez introduced Goh to Spanish guitarist Andrés Segovia who was so impressed with Goh's musical talent that he offered Goh guitar lessons free of charge in Barcelona. Goh left Geneva for Barcelona in December 1935, and was further introduced to Spanish violinist Francisco Costa by Segovia who offered Goh to stay, and learn the violin from him in his home in Calle Muntaner. His sojourn in Barcelona came to an end, when Goh had to flee from the Spanish Civil War in July 1936. As a parting gift, Segovia gave him a Rudolfo Cauracho guitar.

Goh arrived in Brussels via Paris and the Netherlands, and went to seek Alfred Marchot at the Royal Academy of Music with a letter of introduction written by Costa earlier. Marchot was impressed with Goh's earnestness and his talent, and was willing to teach Goh for free. The prolonged hunger pangs, malnutrition and stress caused by the lack of food brought about a paralysis in three fingers of his left hand, killing his hopes of playing the violin ever again. Goh fell into the trenches of despair, but Marchot was happy to teach him the aesthetics of music until his death in July 1939. After 8 long years' of staying in Europe Goh finally saw that it was pointless to continue staying in Europe, and returned home in Padang with a heavy heart in September that year.

Singapore
Arriving home a broken man with a crippled dream, Goh picked himself up and told himself I will make my fortune with these two violins. In 1940, he established a music studio above a garage in Oldham Lane in Singapore, and gave music and French language lessons. The business did not last long as the Japanese had invaded and occupied Singapore in 1941, and he was rounded up along with other able-bodied men by the Japanese. Goh was made to stand under the hot sun for three days, and when one of his friends in the group was allowed to leave, his friend was given a choice to choose another person to leave with him and he chose Goh. Both Goh and his friend had escaped death, while the rest of the group were sent to the firing squad the very next day.

He went on to have a successful musical career as a Conductor of the Singapore Youth Symphony Orchestra between 1971 and 1975, as well as founding the Goh Soon Tioe String Orchestra. In his illustrious teaching years, he produced Singapore's musical prodigies like Dick Lee, Lynnette Seah, Kam Kee Yong, Seow Yit Kin, Melvyn Tan, Choo Hoey and Lim Soon Lee, Music Director/ Resident Conductor of the National University of Singapore Concert Orchestra. In all the musical talents he had produced, violinist Lee Pan Hon was one he had remembered well.

As a child, Lee Pan Hon had shown talent in music, but living in the Chinatown slums his family was too poor to afford proper clothing for the then 5-year-old boy in 1958. Goh took upon himself to groom young Lee, to becoming a great violin maestro in the United Kingdom.

Goh was awarded Pingat Jasa Gemilang (Meritorious Service Medal) for his immense achievements and contributions to the Singapore society. He died in 1982.

References

Further reading
 Abishegenaden, Paul (2005) Notes across the years: anecdotes from a musical life. Singapore : Unipress.
 Koh, Tommy (ed.) (2006) Singapore : The Encyclopaedia. Singapore : Editions Didier Millet.

1911 births
1982 deaths
Anglo-Chinese School alumni
Singaporean people of Chinese descent
Singaporean musicians
Singaporean classical violinists
Singaporean classical musicians
Indonesian emigrants to Singapore
Indonesian people of Chinese descent
Indonesian Hokkien people
20th-century classical violinists